Vatolaivy is a small village in Arivonimamo, west of Antananarivo, Madagascar.

There are catholic and Protestant churches, a primary school, shops, a market place, a hostel and restaurant, and a sport area.

Around this little village there are plots of the natural forest of typical endemic species Uapaca bojeri, commonly known as "tapia forest".  These plots of forests are now under transferred management to local communities.  This process called GELOSE is set to help for their conservation. these "native trees" are used to feed silkworm and thus to produce raw material for weavers and handcraft maker.  The end products provides external incomes for these communities.

Populated places in Antananarivo Province